Aitch is an English surname.  Notable people with the surname include:

Iain Aitch, English writer, journalist, and artist
Matt Aitch (1944–2007), American basketball player

English-language surnames